The Beginning Vol. 5 is the first and only single disc compilation released by Frijid Pink in 1973. This disc contains five songs from their first and second albums, Frijid Pink and Defrosted. This album was only released in Germany by Deram Records and possibly as an import throughout the rest of the world.

Track listing

Side one
 House of the Rising Sun (4:44)
 Drivin' Blues (3:14)
 Black Lace (6:10)
 Bye Bye Blues (4:56)
 God Gave Me You (3:35)

Side two
 I'm Movin' (4:53)
 Sloony (instrumental) (3:36)
 I'm On My Way (4:34)
 Tell Me Why (2:50)
 Pain In My Heart (8:19)

Personnel 
 Kelly Green - lead vocals, percussion
 Gary Ray Thompson - guitars
 Tom Harris - bass (tracks 1,2,5,8,9)
 Tom Beaudry - bass (tracks 3,4,6,7,10)
 Richard "Rick" Stevers - drums
 Larry Zelanka - keyboards

Frijid Pink albums
1973 compilation albums
Deram Records compilation albums